Emiliano Mondonico (9 March 1947 – 29 March 2018) was an Italian professional footballer and coach. He played as a winger.

His playing career was spent mostly with Cremonese, where it began and ended. Mondonico's 31-year-long managerial career included two spells each at Cremonese, Atalanta, Torino and AlbinoLeffe. With Torino, he reached the final of the 1991–92 UEFA Cup and won the 1992–93 Coppa Italia.

Club career

Mondonico grew up playing in the youth team of Rivoltana, an amateur team in his hometown of Rivolta d'Adda in the Province of Cremona. In 1966 he was signed by Cremonese, with whom he played one season in Serie D and one season in Serie C. In the 1968–69 season, he made his Serie A debut with Torino. After two seasons with the Granata, he moved to Monza in Serie B, before returning to Serie A with Atalanta in the 1971–72 season. He later returned to Cremonese where he ended his playing career after seven seasons disputed between Serie B and Serie C in 1979.

Managerial career

Mondonico began his managerial career with the Cremonese youth team in 1979. In 1982, he became manager of the senior team, and in 1984, achieved a historic promotion to Serie A with Cremonese.

In 1987, he moved to Atalanta, and guided them to the semi-finals of the 1987–88 European Cup Winners' Cup.

In 1990, he joined Torino, where he won the Mitropa Cup over Pisa and finished in fifth-place in the league during the 1990–91 season. The following year, he led Torino to a historic UEFA Cup final during the 1991–92 season, lost on aggregate to AFC Ajax. After Torino were disallowed a penalty, Mondonico famously lifted up a chair into the air in a sign of protest against the referee. In the 1992–93 season, he won the 1993 Coppa Italia Final against Roma.

In 1994, he returned to Atalanta for a second time, and later had a second spell with Torino as well between 1998 and 2000, before coaching Napoli during the 2000–01 season, although he was unable to help the club avoid relegation to Serie B.

After a two-year spell with Cosenza, he later joined Fiorentina in 2003, and the following year, he led the club back into Serie A for the first time since their demotion to Serie C2, following their bankruptcy in 2002; he subsequently had a stint with AlbinoLeffe in Serie B in 2006, before returning to Cremonese the following year for a third time.

In September 2009, Mondonico was appointed as head coach of AlbinoLeffe once again to replace Armando Madonna. He stepped down as head coach of AlbinoLeffe on 29 January 2011 due to "serious health issues", with his assistant Daniele Fortunato taking over on an interim basis. Two days later, his club confirmed he had undergone abdominal surgery, expecting him to recover in a few weeks time. On 15 February, after a full recovery, Mondonico officially returned to his coaching duties at AlbinoLeffe. He guided AlbinoLeffe to narrowly escape relegation after defeating Piacenza in the playoffs, but on 13 June he held an emotional press conference to announce that the illness had returned during the final period of the season and that he was seriously considering stepping down as a consequence. On 17 June 2011 Mondonico was confirmed to have resigned from AlbinoLeffe in order to focus solely on cancer treatment; he was replaced by his assistant Daniele Fortunato, who had already undertaken the first team coaching duties during his previous sick leave.

On 30 January 2012, Mondonico marked his Serie A comeback, replacing Attilio Tesser as head coach of Novara, who were last-placed in the Italian top flight and seven points shy of relegation safety after the first half of the season. On 6 March 2012 he was sacked.

Death
Mondonico died at the age of 71 on 29 March 2018, from stomach cancer.

Honours

Manager

 Torino
 Mitropa Cup: 1991
 Coppa Italia: 1992–93

Individual
Torino F.C. Hall of Fame: 2018

Bibliography

References

1947 births
2018 deaths
Sportspeople from the Province of Cremona
Association football wingers
Italian footballers
U.S. Cremonese players
Torino F.C. players
A.C. Monza players
Atalanta B.C. players
Serie A players
Serie B players
Serie C players
Serie D players
Italian football managers
U.S. Cremonese managers
Como 1907 managers
Atalanta B.C. managers
Torino F.C. managers
S.S.C. Napoli managers
Cosenza Calcio managers
ACF Fiorentina managers
U.C. AlbinoLeffe managers
Novara F.C. managers
Serie A managers
Deaths from cancer in Lombardy
Deaths from stomach cancer
People from Rivolta d'Adda
Footballers from Lombardy